On May 2, 2011, United States President Barack Obama confirmed that al-Qaeda leader Osama bin Laden had been killed in his compound in Abbottabad, northeastern Pakistan. Bin Laden's death was welcomed throughout most  of the world as a fitting end to a figure who had inspired mass bloodshed, and a positive and significant turning point in the fight against al-Qaeda and related groups. Those who welcomed it included the United Nations, European Union, NATO, and some nations in Asia, Africa, Oceania, South America, and the Middle East, including Yemen, Lebanon, Saudi Arabia, India, Israel, Indonesia, Somalia, the Philippines, Turkey, Iraq, Australia, Argentina, and the rebel Libyan Republic.

His killing was condemned, however, by the Hamas administration of the Gaza Strip, the Muslim Brotherhood, and the Taliban. Iran and the Muslim Brotherhood opined that bin Laden's death removed "the last excuse" for western forces to remain in the Middle East, and urged their withdrawal. The monitoring of Jihadist websites after bin Laden's death, by intelligence agency SITE, revealed encouragement of attacks in retaliation for his killing.

United States

Even before the official announcement, crowds gathered spontaneously to celebrate outside the White House, where thousands assembled. Hundreds of New Yorkers also gathered in Times Square and at Ground Zero, the site of the terrorist attacks of September 11, 2001. In Dearborn, Michigan, a suburb of Detroit with a large Muslim and Arab population, a small crowd gathered outside the City Hall in celebration, many of them of Middle Eastern descent. From the beginning to the end of Obama's speech, 4,000 tweets were sent per second on Twitter.

Fans attending a nationally televised Sunday Night Baseball Major League Baseball game between two National League East rivals, the Philadelphia Phillies and the New York Mets, at Citizens Bank Park in Philadelphia initiated U-S-A! cheers in response to the news, confusing players and officials alike because no official announcement was made until later. Likewise, at WWE Extreme Rules 2011, a pay-per-view broadcast emanating from the St. Pete Times Forum in Tampa, Florida, newly crowned WWE Champion John Cena announced the news to the audience following the event's conclusion, resulting in a massive "U-S-A!" chant from the crowd. Students at Ohio State University celebrated by jumping into Mirror Lake, a tradition done before playing rivals Michigan in football. Hundreds of students at the University of Notre Dame, located in Notre Dame, Indiana, spontaneously gathered and celebrated by setting off fireworks, yelling loud chants, and running through busy student centers and libraries, many screaming the entire way through and carrying American flags. Students at the University of Southern California celebrated on USC's Greek Row, playing the national anthem and blasting fireworks. Students from many other universities, including midshipmen from the U.S. Naval Academy, and cadets from the U.S. Military Academy and U.S. Air Force Academy, also celebrated when they got the news. Indian Americans hailed the U.S. Special Forces, and accused Pakistan of sheltering bin Laden and other terrorists.

All four major broadcast television networks (ABC, CBS, NBC and Fox) interrupted their regularly scheduled programming to cover the news. Nine television networks in total carried Obama's announcement, watched by 56.5 million Americans, his largest audience since election night.

In addition to the jubilant celebrations, many visitors quietly reflected at the Pentagon Memorial.

Current and former officials
Former U.S. President George W. Bush said that "this momentous achievement marks a victory for America, for people who seek peace around the world, and for all those who lost loved ones on September 11, 2001".  Former U.S. President Bill Clinton described it as "a profoundly important moment for people all over the world who want to build a common future of peace, freedom, and cooperation for our children". U.S. Secretary of State Hillary Clinton said: "The fight [against terrorism] continues, and we will never waver. I know there are some who doubted this day would ever come, who questioned our resolve and our reach. But let us remind ourselves, this is America. We rise to the challenge, we persevere, and we get the job done." 

New York City Mayor Michael Bloomberg said that he hoped the death of bin Laden "would comfort those who lost loved ones" in the September 11, 2001 attacks. Former National Security Advisor and Secretary of State Condoleezza Rice characterized the news as "absolutely thrilling", adding that she was "overwhelmed with gratitude and continue[s] to be amazed at what our military has achieved". The event was also applauded by past Republican presidential contenders, including former Massachusetts governor Mitt Romney, former Minnesota governor Tim Pawlenty, and Senator John McCain. Several U.S. senators questioned whether Pakistani authorities knew about bin Laden's presence in Pakistan, and had protected him.

On May 12, 2011, former Supreme Court Justice John Paul Stevens, speaking at a Northwestern University symposium, told the audience that based on his knowledge of the facts, "It was not merely to do justice and avenge Sept. 11, [but] to remove an enemy who had been trying every day to attack the United States.... I haven't the slightest doubt it was entirely appropriate for American forces to act" as they did.

In an interview with 60 Minutes, U.S. Secretary of Defense Robert Gates said "I worked for a lot of these guys [referring to the eight U.S. commanders-in-chief he has worked for during his career]. And this is one of the most courageous calls, decisions that I think I've ever seen a president make. For all of the concerns that I've just been talking about. The uncertainty of the intelligence. The consequences of it going bad. The risk to the lives of the Americans involved. It was a very gutsy call."

Pakistan

Government
Following the death of bin Laden, President Asif Ali Zardari convened emergency talks with Prime Minister Yousuf Raza Gilani and security chiefs in Islamabad. Gilani said: "We will not allow our soil to be used against any other country for terrorism and therefore I think it's a great victory, it's a success and I congratulate the success of this operation." Later Gilani blamed the world for their failure to capture bin Laden.

The day after the raid, the Pakistani government lashed out at the U.S., saying that the United States had taken "an unauthorized unilateral action" that would not be tolerated in the future. The foreign ministry further said, "Such an event shall not serve as a future precedent for any state, including the United States."

Foreign Secretary Salman Bashir said, "Any other country that would ever act on assumption that it has the right to unilateralism of any sort will find as far as Pak is concerned that it has made a basic mistake". He further stated that Pakistani military had scrambled F-16s after they became aware of the attack but that they reached the compound after American helicopters had left. Bashir also warned the U.S. and India against any such covert operations in the future, saying this would lead to a "terrible catastrophe".

Former Pakistani President Pervez Musharraf criticized the operation, saying, "America coming to our territory and taking action is a violation of our sovereignty, handling and execution of the operation [by U.S. forces] is not correct. The Pakistani government should have been kept in the loop."

Speaking at the Lahore Press Club, former Foreign Minister Shah Mehmood Qureshi criticised the government and openly demanded an explanation from top officials regarding the incident. He also called for President Zardari and Prime Minister Gillani to resign. Terming the American raid as "unprovoked aggression", Qureshi added that instead of addressing the nation during the crisis, Zardari instead chose to write an opinion piece in a foreign newspaper.

Cricketer-turned-politician Imran Khan said Pakistan had "lost its dignity and self-esteem" in the wake of the Osama operation and lashed out at the government and the intelligence. "The big questions that everyone began asking, and for which no answers have been forthcoming, were: who allowed the Americans to come to Pakistan and carry out this attack? And whatever happened to the Pakistani Army and its intelligence?".

In an interview in 2019, Pakistani prime minister Imran Khan claimed that Pakistani intelligence led CIA to Osama bin Laden

"We in Pakistan always felt that we were an ally of the US and if we had been given the information about Osama bin Laden, we should have taken him out." said Khan.

Military
Pakistan's military officials declined to comment, referring questions to the foreign ministry. After the operation, Pakistan's Inter-Services Intelligence admitted that there had been an intelligence failure. An official stated that the same compound had been raided in 2003, but since then had not been monitored. However, this account was disputed by American officials who said that satellite photos show that even as late as 2004, the site was an empty field. Pakistan's Military chief Ashfaq Parvez Kayani called the operation a "misadventure" and stated that no further raids would be tolerated. In addition he announced that the number of private American military personnel in Pakistan will be reduced "to the minimum essential".

According to a statement by Pakistan Air Force Chief Marshal Rao Qamar Suleman, there had been an air-surveillance failure. Qamar covered the inquiry by saying that the air space was unable to detect the American helicopters because the radar installed on the western borders were inactive on the day of the incident. The U.S. helicopters also reportedly used radar-evading measures, such as stealth technology, to avoid detection.

Public
A poll conducted among educated respondents from Lahore, Karachi and Islamabad showed that 75% of them disapproved of the U.S. operation and 66% disbelieved that Osama Bin Laden had been killed at the compound in Abbottabad. There was also frustration and fierce criticism among the public and in Pakistani media against the military for its inability and failure in not detecting the American raid and allowing it to occur.
A local resident, in reference to the security forces, commented: "This is what they are paid for, to defend the borders, not to run bakeries and banks and real-estate empires."

Numerous mobile text messages were observed doing the rounds in the country, apparently ridiculing the defence agencies for the security lapse.
There was mounting public outrage against President Zardari, who offered no official remarks even five days after the incident. Zardari also left for state visits to Kuwait and Russia immediately after the operation, while Prime Minister Gillani left for a three-day state visit to France.

People's Republic of China

Government
The People's Republic of China (PRC) said on Monday evening that the death of Osama bin Laden was "a milestone and a positive development for the international anti-terrorism efforts". Chinese Foreign Ministry spokeswoman Jiang Yu made the remarks when asked to comment on the killing of the al-Qaeda leader. China supported Pakistan amid growing questions in the U.S. about whether the country was complicit in harboring Osama bin Laden saying the, "Pakistani government's determination to fight terrorism are staunch and its actions have been vigorous." Chinese Premier Wen Jiabao discussed the issue with the U.S. in official talks. He asked the U.S. to respect Pakistan's sovereignty, and acknowledge its sacrifices in the war against terror.

Political analysis
The vice president of the University of International Relations stated that bin Laden's death, and the aftermath of such, would not affect Beijing's policies towards Islamabad. Political analyst Hasan Askari stated that while the PRC and Pakistan will remain close, China would not risk its relations with the West over it, citing technological and monetary concerns.

Public response
Public reaction in the PRC to the death of Osama bin laden was mixed. A poll from Hong Kong's Phoenix Television of 500,000 Chinese netizens had 60% of respondents agree that bin Laden's death was a sad event because "he was an anti-US warrior". However, a report from Public Radio International documented that other social media users showed sympathy to the American cause, while most Chinese on and offline did not care about his death. Further reports indicated that many others on Sina Weibo were celebrating, since his agenda had been linked to separatism in Xinjiang. Some tech-savvy Chinese activists and intellectuals even used the event to criticise, or call attention to, PRC's domestic policies.

India

Military
In the wake of Operation Neptune Spear there were calls for similar strikes conducted by India against Hafiz Muhammad Saeed and Dawood Ibrahim, with Indian Army Chief General V K Singh telling reporters, "I would like to say only this that if such a chance comes, then all the three arms (of the Indian Defense Forces) are competent to do this". Indian Air Chief Marshal P V Naik said that India has the capability to carry out such surgical strikes against terrorists.

Following the death of bin Laden in Pakistan, the Border Security Force of India was put on high alert along India's 553 km border with Pakistan, in Punjab. However, a former Pakistani Air Force commander dismissed this as the rhetoric of "paper tigers", and Indian Minister for Home Affairs P. Chidambaram cautioned that India might be unable to carry out such an attack because, "We don't have our forces on Pakistani soil. We are not invited there. We don't have any support from Pakistan."

Public
The public in India celebrated the death of bin Laden across its various cities, by thanking and congratulating the United States. In the Indian capital New Delhi, crowds gathered in the streets to celebrate the occasion, thanking U.S. President Barack Obama. "Festival like celebrations" were seen in Ahmedabad, where people lit firecrackers and burned photographs of bin Laden while shouting slogans. People in the coastal town of Udupi rejoiced on Monday by exchanging greetings and distributing sweets. Celebratory crowds in Udupi, headed by the chief of Shiroor Matha, shouted slogans and burned an effigy of bin Laden. In Bangalore, over 100 members of the Sri Ram Sene converged in Freedom Park in a jubilant mood to celebrate with firecrackers and the passing out of sweets to passers-by. The news of bin Laden's death was watched by 42.6 million Indians.

Government
Prime Minister of India Manmohan Singh welcomed the news of bin Laden's death, saying, "I welcome it as a significant step forward and hope that it will deal a decisive blow to Al-Qaeda and other terrorist groups. The international community and Pakistan in particular must work comprehensively to end the activities of all such groups who threaten civilized behaviour and kill innocent men, women and children." Minister for Home Affairs P. Chidambaram said that bin Laden hiding near Islamabad was a matter of grave concern for India as evidence the country was a "sanctuary" for terrorists. He called on Pakistan to arrest "many of the perpetrators of the Mumbai terror attacks, including the controllers and the handlers of the terrorists who actually carried out the attack", who he alleged "continue to be sheltered in Pakistan".

Minister of External Affairs S. M. Krishna hailed the killing of bin Laden as "historic" and a "victorious milestone" in the global war against terrorism. The Chief Minister of Gujarat, Narendra Modi, expressed his happiness about bin Laden's death, and the Bharatiya Janata Party (BJP) also hailed the news. The BJP said that bin Laden was the most dangerous face of global and jihadi terrorism and needed to be punished for his evil ideologies and stressed that his death in Pakistan proved India's repeated assertion that "Pakistan is the epicenter of global terrorism". Senior BJP leader Sushma Swaraj (also the opposition leader in the Indian Parliament) said, "Osama was enemy number one of humanity".

Organizations

Supranational union
  – the European Parliament President, Jerzy Buzek said, "We have woken up in a more secure world."

International organizations
 Interpol – Interpol's Secretary General Ronald Noble congratulated the U.S. and its counterparts worldwide for the gathering and sharing of intelligence that permitted the U.S. to locate bin Laden and launch a targeted operation to bring him to justice. He stated that since the death of bin Laden does not represent the demise of al-Qaeda affiliates and those inspired by al-Qaeda, no continent or region of the world is safe from terrorism. He urged the network of Interpol National Central Bureaus and all law enforcement agencies to be on full alert for acts of retaliation from al-Qaeda if they should attempt to prove they still exist.
 The Organisation of Islamic Cooperation's Secretary General said, "Bin Laden ... was responsible for many unjustified bloodshed and attacks against innocent civilians", and emphasized the OIC's condemnation of terrorism. He stated the necessity of bringing terrorists to justice, but said that counter-terrorism activities should focus on the causes of terrorism.
  – NATO Secretary General Anders Fogh Rasmussen said the killing of bin Laden is a "significant success" for the security of NATO allies.
  – Secretary-General Ban Ki-moon hailed bin Laden's death as "a watershed moment in our common global fight against terrorism".

Islamic organizations
 Ahmadiyya national spokesman Harris Zafar said: "As a Muslim, I am happy that a known terrorist like Osama bin Laden has been brought down and his reign of terror has come to an end. His actions ran counter to the true, peaceful, message of Islam, and he created so much mistrust and misconception of Islam. I hope other Muslims will realize that he was not a leader of Muslims. He was only a leader of extremists."
 The Council on American–Islamic Relations issued a statement saying: "We join our fellow citizens in welcoming the announcement that Osama bin Laden has been eliminated as a threat to our nation and the world through the actions of American military personnel. ... Bin Laden never represented Muslims or Islam. In fact, in addition to the killing of thousands of Americans, he and Al-Qaeda caused the deaths of countless Muslims worldwide."
 The Islamic Society of North America (ISNA) said it "joins all Americans in thanking President Obama for fulfilling his promise to bring Osama Bin Laden, leader of al-Qaeda, and perpetrator of the 9/11 attacks, to justice". ISNA President Imam Magid said that the "ideology of bin Laden is incompatible with Islam".
 The Muslim American Society announced: "Justice has been served." Praying that bin Laden's death will bring solace to all families that have been victimized by al-Qaeda, President Ahmed El Bendary stated, "His crimes were against all humanity. It is correct and fair that Bin Laden should be held accountable for his crimes".
 The Muslim Brotherhood in Egypt issued a statement in which it condemned bin Laden's killing, calling it an "assassination". Muslim Brotherhood second-in-command Mahmud Ezzat, in contrast, said: "Islam is not bin Laden. After September 11, there had been a lot of confusion. Terrorism was mixed up with Islam. In the coming phase, everyone will be looking to the West for just behaviour." He added that, with bin Laden dead, western forces should now pull out of Iraq and Afghanistan.
 The Muslim Judicial Council, the largest Islamic representative body in South Africa, condemned the way in which bin Laden was killed. The council described bin Laden's death as a failure of justice, saying he should instead have been captured and put on trial, and also that the way the body was buried at sea contradicts Muslim customs and was disrespectful to a community of over a billion people.
 The Muslim Public Affairs Council expressed great relief over bin Laden's death. MPAC president Salam Al-Marayati explained: "the elimination of bin Laden represents a swift blow against terrorism." He said that he felt it was a game-changer, but that he did not "think we've achieved victory against terrorism".
 The Al-Aqsa Martyrs' Brigades in the West Bank of the Palestinian territories, the military wing of the Fatah party, was reported by the Ma'an News Agency to have mourned bin Laden's death, declaring in a statement: "The Islamic nation was shocked with the news that bin Laden had been killed by the non-believers. He left a generation who follows the education he gave in Jihad. The fighters in Palestine and around the world who have lost their leaders did not stop their mission and will continue in the tutelage of their masters. We tell the Israeli and the American occupiers that we have leaders who have changed history with their Jihad and their steadfastness. We are ready to sacrifice our lives to bring back peace." Ma'an later reported that the group's spokesman denied issuing the statement.
 An Al-Qaeda in the Arabian Peninsula member said: "This news has been a catastrophe for us. At first we did not believe it, but we got in touch with our brothers in Pakistan who have confirmed it."
 Hamas denounced the killing of bin Laden: "We condemn the assassination and the killing of an 'Arab holy warrior'. We regard this as a continuation of the American policy based on oppression and the shedding of Muslim and Arab blood." Ismail Haniyeh, a senior political leader of Hamas and one of two disputed Prime Ministers of the Palestinian National Authority, said: "We condemn any killing of a holy warrior or of a Muslim and Arab person and we ask Allah to bestow his mercy upon him." Ismail al-Ashqar, a Hamas lawmaker, called it "state terrorism that America carries out against Muslims".
 The United States and the United Kingdom condemned Hamas for mourning bin Laden's death and referring to him as a "holy warrior". A U.S. State Department spokesman called the reference "outrageous", and British Foreign Secretary William Hague echoed that sentiment.
 A Tehrik-i-Taliban Pakistan spokesman said: "If he [bin Laden] has been martyred, we will avenge his death and launch attacks against American and Pakistani governments and their security forces... If he has become a martyr, it is a great victory for us because martyrdom is the aim of all of us."
 On May 6, Al-Qaeda confirmed the death of Osama bin Laden in a statement posted on jihadist internet forums. It said, "We also stress that the blood of the mujahid Sheikh Osama bin Laden, may Allah have mercy upon him, weighs more to us and is more precious to us and to every Muslim than to be wasted in vain." The message called upon Pakistan, where bin Laden was discovered, "We call upon our Muslim people in Pakistan, on whose land Sheikh Osama was killed, to rise up and revolt to cleanse this shame that has been attached to them by a clique of traitors and thieves who sold everything to the enemies."
 On May 13, the Pakistani Taliban claimed responsibility for a suicide bombing attack at a paramilitary academy in Charsadda, Pakistan that killed 80 people as revenge for the death of bin Laden.  A spokesman for the Pakistani Taliban, Ehsanullah Ehsan, called from an undisclosed location saying, "There will be more."

NGOs 
 Amnesty International had concerns about the nature and circumstances surrounding Osama bin Laden's death. "We are seeking information from the US and Pakistani authorities about how many people were in the compound at the time of the operation, what happened to them and specifically what is the status and current whereabouts of the survivors," said Claudio Cordone, Senior Director at Amnesty International. Since he was unarmed, they raised concerns that there was no attempt to capture him alive. While condemning bin Laden for crimes against humanity, Amnesty International stressed the importance of doing so in compliance with international law.
 Pakistani and U.S. officials responded, saying there were 18 people in the compound. They report that five people were killed, and two women wounded, both of whom were left with at least six children, at the compound. Central Intelligence Agency Director Leon Panetta said that, although they were to capture bin Laden if he surrendered, they were authorized to kill. The White House reported that bin Laden resisted arrest.
 The U.N. High Commissioner for Human Rights, Navi Pillay said, "This was a complex operation and it would be helpful if we knew the precise facts surrounding his killing. The United Nations has consistently emphasized that all counter-terrorism acts must respect international law." Pillay did point out that the U.S. intended to arrest him if possible, and pointed out that taking bin Laden alive was likely to be difficult. Had he been taken to court, Pillay said that, "I have no doubt he would have been charged with the most serious crimes, including the mass murder of civilians that took place on 9/11, which were planned and systematic and in my view amounted to crime against humanity."
 Human Rights Watch stated that bin Laden's death "is a reminder of the thousands of innocents who suffer when terrorist groups seek political change through brutal means" and called on the U.S. government to release more information regarding the operation to clarify whether "it was justified under international law". HRW's Asia director said that "if [bin Laden] wasn't shooting at the soldiers, the killing should be investigated", while Kenneth Roth, HRW's executive director, criticized UN Secretary General Ban Ki-moon for calling the death an "act of justice", arguing that "even if [the killing was] justified" bin Laden was not given a trial and there was no conviction.
 The Red Cross said that if it had any issues with the operation, it would contact the governments directly, and handle the situation confidentially. It also stated that it "does not at this stage have enough facts about the operation to assess its legal and/or humanitarian implications".
 Code Pink co-founder, Medea Benjamin writing about the killing of bin Laden in the Huffington Post, says that the United States never had any "justification for invading Iraq", that there is no "justification for continuing the war in Afghanistan", and that in Pakistan, the US "drone attacks are only fueling the violence and creating more Osama Bin Ladens." And she adds, "Let us not sink into a false sense of triumphalism in the wake of Bin Laden's passing."
 Cageprisoners published an editorial written as news satire dated May 15, 2021 announcing that "American War Criminal Barack Obama has been killed by Pakistani security forces in the UK."  Cageprisoners followed up with an explanation two days later:  "The idea of the piece was to highlight the immorality of extrajudicial killings to those who justify and celebrate the assassination of Osama Bin Laden."

Media
Said Steve Kroft on the May 8, 2011, edition of 60 Minutes, "For more than a decade, bin Laden managed to elude the U.S. military and intelligence establishments, and he taunted three U.S. presidents. That finally ended last Sunday, and the last thing bin Laden saw was a Navy SEAL in the third floor bedroom of his compound in Pakistan." According to The Economist, "The silence of the usual critics of 'illegal', 'extrajudicial', targeted killing in the wake of America's killing of Osama bin Laden might reflect hypocrisy, sure. But this can be tough to distinguish from resignation to the fact that Mr Obama didn't submit his case for executing Mr bin Laden to some global civil authority because there isn't one and he didn't have to—because America's the biggest kid on the block and, ultimately, what America says goes. And, if it comes down to it, Britain, France, Italy, Russia and other powerful governments hope America will indulge their own kill-squad adventures with similar approving silences. Of course, if some aggrieved faction in the future seeks retribution through the targeted killing of one of these countries' leaders, that will be raw vengeance, that will be terrorism, that will be an international crime, because, like it or not, that's how it works."

George Will suggested that America could use bin Laden's death to "draw a deep breath and some pertinent conclusions", among them that "bin Laden was brought down by intelligence gathering that more resembles excellent police work than a military operation." He added, "There remains much more to al-Qaeda than bin Laden, and there are many more tentacles to the terrorism threat than al-Qaeda and its affiliates. So 'the long war' must go on. But perhaps such language is bewitching our minds, because this is not essentially war."

Countries and territories

Africa

Americas

Asia

Europe

Eastern Europe

Northern Europe

Southern Europe

Western Europe

Middle East

Oceania

Individuals
 The scope of international interest in this incident can be illustrated with over three million tweets about bin Laden's death released by various individuals as of May 7, 2011. Twitter has protested when researchers attempted to analyze that data.
 The 14th Dalai Lama said, "Forgiveness doesn't mean forget what happened. … If something is serious and it is necessary to take counter-measures, you have to take counter-measures."
 Rowan Williams, the Archbishop of Canterbury, said "it doesn't look as if justice ... is done," concerning the killing of an unarmed man. He elaborated, "I don't know full details any more than anyone else does. But I do believe that in such circumstances when we are faced with someone who was manifestly a war criminal, in terms of the atrocities inflicted, it is important that justice is seen to be observed."
 Salman Rushdie – novelist and essayist, said: "It is time to declare Pakistan a terrorist state and expel it from the community of nations." Rushdie asked whether the world is to believe Pakistan when it professes its ignorance about Osama's presence on its soil in the very town housing its elite military academy. He stated: "In the aftermath of the raid on Abbottabad, all the big questions need to be answered by Pakistan."
 Noam Chomsky – scholar in the field of linguistics as well as an anarchist and libertarian socialist, said: "We might ask ourselves how we would be reacting if Iraqi commandos landed at George W. Bush's compound, assassinated him, and dumped his body in the Atlantic. Uncontroversially, his crimes vastly exceed bin Laden's, and he is not a 'suspect' but uncontroversially the 'decider' who gave the orders to commit the "supreme international crime differing only from other war crimes in that it contains within itself the accumulated evil of the whole" (quoting the Nuremberg Tribunal) for which Nazi criminals were hanged: the hundreds of thousands of deaths, millions of refugees, destruction of much of the country, the bitter sectarian conflict that has now spread to the rest of the region."
 Henry Kissinger, former advisor to Presidents Nixon and Ford, commended President Obama on the matter. He pointed out that, "Operationally, the general view seems to be that bin Laden was not in active operational control anymore. But symbolically, as the head of the movement, his death has a blighting effect." He indicated that relations with Pakistan will be difficult, but that there should be an increase in Pakistan's role in America's foreign policy. He urged Obama to think critically about how this affects the war in Afghanistan, but said, "[o]n the whole, I think that it has been an extremely positive development."

Pro-bin Laden rallies

 On May 2, around 1200 supporters of the Taliban attended a rally in the Pakistani city of Quetta to pay homage to Osama bin Laden, chanting "death to America" and setting fire to a U.S. flag, witnesses and organisers said. One of the demonstrators, Asmatullah said: "Bin Laden was the hero of the Muslim world and after his martyrdom he has won the title of great mujahed (Muslim fighter)."
 On May 4, hundreds of people in the city of Multan, marched through the streets in a pro-bin Laden rally, protesting the killing of bin Laden by U.S. Special Forces. The crowd held placards and burned U.S. flags.
 On May 5, Pakistan's biggest and most influential political Islamist party Jamaat-i-Islami, held a pro-Bin Laden rally in Islamabad chanting anti-American, anti-Israeli and anti-Indian slogans.
 On May 5, 150 Pakistani lawyers in Peshawar, describing themselves as "followers" of bin Laden, prayed for him outside the Peshawar High Court. Organizer Gul Nabi said that "bin Laden was as a martyr and this prayer was not offered anywhere. It was an Faraz-e-Kafaya (Islamic obligation) so we performed this and we did this just to complete this Namaz-e-janaza (funeral) for all those Shaheeds (martyrs) who were killed in Abbottabad." After the prayers, the lawyers chanted anti-American slogans.
 On May 6, mass crowds gathered in Kuchlak, held a pro- bin Laden rally, headed by the political party Jamiat Ulema-e-Islam. The demonstrators carried picture of bin Laden and burned a U.S. flag.
 On May 7, religious and religio-political parties held demonstrations and rallies outside mosques after Friday prayers across Pakistan including Lahore to protest against the growing U.S. interference, drone attacks, Abbotabad operation and the resultant killing of bin Laden. During Friday prayers, imams termed the war on terror as war against Islam and Muslims, they also stressed that Islamic countries should unite to fight against a common enemy. A mammoth rally was also held in Mansoora, Lahore, the headquarters of Jamat-e-Islami against the U.S. operation, where the ameer of Jamaat-e-Islami Syed Munawar Hasan was also present and warned "Washington and her allies" that terrorism would not come to an end through a war against Islam and the Muslims.

 On May 2, dozens of Palestinian Arab residents of Silwan in East Jerusalem held a rally in support of Osama bin Laden. Some demonstrators threw stones at Israel Police officers. Ynet noted that bin Laden had made various statements in support of the Palestinians and against Israel, had declared that Muslims were engaged in a war against Jews, and had criticized the United States for "its support of Israel and the ongoing occupation in Palestine".
 On the day after bin Laden's death, 25 people, including al-Qaeda sympathizers and students, gathered for a rally outside a Gaza City university. Some said they opposed bin Laden's ideology, but nonetheless considered him a martyr and were angry at the U.S. for killing him.
 On May 7, dozens of Salafists Islamists gathered in the main square of Gaza City to protest against bin Laden's killing. The demonstrators, chanting "We warn you America, we warn you Europe", held posters of bin Laden along with banners reading "We are all your soldiers Osama" and "Osama is alive inside us." The protest was broken up by Hamas police. Reuters noted that while Hamas itself had denounced the killing of bin Laden as well, it had recently engaged in gun battles with Gazan Salafist groups.

 On May 3, around 1,000 people rallied in Khartoum, Sudan, to praise bin Laden, chanting "Death to America". The gathering was attended by junior members of the ruling northern National Congress Party. The rally consisted of a prayer and several speeches by radical Sunni Muslim clerics who praised bin Laden and called on Arab leaders to fight the US. Sheikh Abu Zaid Mohammed Hamza declared: "Islam is calling to fight against the USA because it supports Israel and the Jews... We hope that all Arab presidents will become like Osama bin Laden." Sheikh Abdul Hai Youssuf said that "Osama bin Laden is our brother".

 On May 6, about 200 people rallied at the Fatih Mosque in Istanbul, by protesting the killing of bin Laden by U.S. commandos. After Friday prayers, the demonstrators gathered at the call of Islamist newspaper Millî Gazete, and with the support of the Islamist organization Özgür-Der.

 May 6, Separatist Hurriyat Conference leader Syed Ali Shah Geelani led a gathering for funeral prayers at Batmaloo, Srinagar for al-Qaeda chief Osama bin Laden. Special prayers were given at Pulwama, Bijbehara and Baramulla in  Kashmir. These prayers were attended by about a hundred Kashmiri Muslims who called Osama a martyr. Protesters also shouted anti-U.S. slogans. Although a relatively minor incident, it led to a small riot between police and protesters.

 Hundreds of Islamist Salafists held special prayers Friday for Osama bin Laden at the Salafist-run al-Nour Mosque in the Abbasiyah quarter of Cairo after regular Friday noon prayers, though police tried to stop the special prayers. Some Islamists regard bin Laden as a martyr.

See also

 Death of Osama bin Laden conspiracy theories
 Operation Geronimo name controversy
 Reactions to the September 11 attacks
 The Situation Room (photograph)

References

External links

 Bin Laden Is Dead: The Reaction  – slideshow by Life
 On Social Media, Americans React To Bin Laden Death – report by NPR

2011 in international relations
Killing of Osama bin Laden
Laden, Osama bin
Laden, Osama bin